Fred Barlow (6 September 1873 – 6 August 1948) was an Australian rules footballer who played with Carlton in the Victorian Football League (VFL).

Notes

External links 

Fred Barlow's profile at Blueseum

1873 births
1948 deaths
Australian rules footballers from Victoria (Australia)
Carlton Football Club players